Driwaru is a surname. Notable people with the surname include:

Jennifer Driwaru (born 1982), Ugandan politician and businesswoman
Zaitun Driwaru (born 1977), Ugandan politician

Surnames of African origin